"Is This What I Get for Loving You?" is a pop song written by Phil Spector, Carole King and Gerry Goffin and recorded by 1960s girl group The Ronettes. The song featured Ronettes lead singer Ronnie Spector on lead vocals (credited as Veronica), and Ronettes Nedra Talley and Estelle Bennett on backing vocals.
Released on Philles Records, reaching No. 75 on the Billboard Hot 100 in 1965.

Original recording
By 1965, the popularity of The Ronettes had seriously begun to decline.  1964 had proven to be the group's most successful year, as they placed three songs "(The Best Part of) Breakin' Up" (US, #39), "Do I Love You?" (US #34), and "Walking in the Rain" (US #23) in the top forty on the Billboard charts.  Their first released single in 1965 was "Born To Be Together," which peaked only at number fifty-two. While achieving only a moderate success, "Born To Be Together" is notable for being the first single by The Ronettes to be issued as "The Ronettes featuring Veronica."

"Is This What I Get for Loving You?" was subsequently credited to "The Ronettes featuring Veronica" on the 45 label.

Moving in a different direction from the typical love songs usually recorded by the Ronettes, "Is This What I Get for Loving You?" was the only Ronettes single to revolve around the depression which sets in after the ending of a relationship. Their other singles, such as "Be My Baby", "Baby, I Love You", and "Do I Love You?", had featured a more up-beat, positive attitude towards love, while "Is This What I Get for Loving You?" moved The Ronettes into a different, more mature direction.

Unfortunately, this attempt to bring a more mature image of the group proved to be unsuccessful. "Is This What I Get for Loving You?" became one of The Ronettes most unsuccessful singles, peaking only at a disappointing seventy-five.

Cash Box described it as "a medium-paced pop-blues romantic tear-jerker which ef- fectively builds to an exciting dramatic pitch then interestingly changes pace and slows down once again."

Chart position

Marianne Faithfull version 

In 1966, "Is This What I Get for Loving You?" was recorded by Marianne Faithfull with Andrew Loog Oldham producing: released February 1967, the single reached #43 in United Kingdom, #42 in Australia and #125 in US. It was her last charting single of the sixties.

Other versions 

The song has also been recorded by David Johansen on his 1982 concert album Live It Up and - in Dutch as "Ik was zo graag bij jou gebleven" - by Yasmine on her 1995 album Portfolio.

On January 20, 2021, a few days after the death of Spector, an unreleased 1995 cassette worktape version by Céline Dion, and produced by Spector, was placed on sale on eBay for $10K with a 1-minute and 8 second sample from it.

References

1965 singles
1967 singles
The Ronettes songs
Songs written by Phil Spector
Songs written by Carole King
Songs with lyrics by Gerry Goffin
Song recordings produced by Phil Spector
Philles Records singles
1965 songs